Trevor P. Burton (born 1943) is a retired male pole vaulter who competed for England.
He represented England in the pole vault, at the 1966 British Empire and Commonwealth Games in Kingston, Jamaica.
He was a member of the City of Stoke Athletic Club and was AAA National champion on three occasions.

References

1943 births
English male pole vaulters
Athletes (track and field) at the 1966 British Empire and Commonwealth Games
Living people
Commonwealth Games competitors for England